Julia Dreyfus may refer to:

Julia Louis-Dreyfus, US actress most known for her role on the 1990s NBC sitcom Seinfeld
Julie Dreyfus, French actress and distant relative of the aforementioned American actress.